King of the Hill is a soundtrack album to the animated Fox sitcom King of the Hill. It was released in 1999 via Asylum Records. The album includes covers of southern rock songs and original songs, performed by country and rock artists (some of which have appeared on the show). Two songs from the album were released as singles: Travis Tritt and George Thorogood's cover of Hank Williams' "Move It On Over" and Barenaked Ladies' "Get in Line". Both songs were made into music videos. Brooks & Dunn's cover of Bob Seger's "Against the Wind" also charted on the Billboard Hot Country Singles & Tracks chart at number 53 from unsolicited airplay.

Track listing
 "Move It On Over" – Travis Tritt and George Thorogood 
 "Get in Line" – Barenaked Ladies
 "Down on the Corner" – The Mavericks 
 "Straight to the Moon" – Sheryl Crow 
 "Against the Wind" – Brooks & Dunn 
 "Piece of My Heart" – Faith Hill 
 "I Know a Little" – Trace Adkins 
 "Mow Against the Grain" – The Hill Family Singers 
 "East Bound and Down" – Tonic
 "Free Fallin'" – Deana Carter 
 "Angel Flying Too Close to the Ground" – Willie Nelson and Mark McGrath 
 "Teddy Bear" – Hank Hill 
 "El Paso" – Old 97's 
 "One Tin Soldier" – Luanne Platter (Brittany Murphy) 
 King of the Hill Theme: "Yahoos and Triangles" – The Refreshments

Chart performance

References

Television animation soundtracks
King of the Hill
1999 soundtrack albums
Asylum Records soundtracks